Kampfgeschwader are the German-language name for (air force) bomber units. In WW1, they were air squadrons, while in WW2, they were air wings.

History

First World War
During World War I, Kampfgeschwader were specialized bomber units in the Luftstreitkräfte.

Formally known as Kampfgeschwader der Obersten Heeresleitung, or Kagohl for short, they were assets directly controlled by the Oberste Heeresleitung, the German Army's high command, rather than by army, corps, or division commanders.

Each Kagohl consisted of a headquarters element and six flights, or Kampfstaffeln, of bomber aircraft. Originally intended as strategic bombers, they were repurposed as tactical bombing units when it became apparent their aircraft did not have the range to reach strategic targets.

In 1917, the Kagohls were reorganized into Bombengeschwader der Obersten Heeresleitung (Bogohl) of three Bombenstaffeln (Bosta), each of six heavy bombers and several additional light bombers.

Second World War
In World War II, Kampfgeschwader units were full bomber wings within the 1935-45 Luftwaffe, consisting of three or more Kampfgruppe bomber groups, as a part of a typical Luftflotte's medium or heavy bomber strength.

See also
 Jagdgeschwader
 Geschwader

Imperial German Army Air Service
Luftwaffe